This is a list of Punjabi films of 2014.

List of films

References

External links 
 Punjabi films at the Internet Movie Database

2014
Punjabi